WNKJ is a Christian radio station licensed to Hopkinsville, Kentucky, broadcasting on 89.3 MHz FM.  The station serves the areas of Hopkinsville, Kentucky and Clarksville, Tennessee, and is owned by Pennyrile Christian Community, Inc.

WNKJ's programming includes Christian talk and teaching shows such as Truth for Life with Alistair Begg, Insight for Living with Chuck Swindoll, Turning Point with David Jeremiah, Revive our Hearts with Nancy Leigh DeMoss, Back to Genesis by the Institute for Creation Research, The Alternative with Tony Evans, Focus on the Family, and Unshackled!

Rebroadcasters
WNKJ is simulcast on 91.7 WNLJ in Madisonville, Kentucky, as well as low powered translators on 92.1 in Murray, Kentucky, 98.9 in Dickson, Tennessee, and 101.7 in Providence, Kentucky.

Simulcast

Translators

References

External links
WNKJ's official website

NKJ
Radio stations established in 1981
1981 establishments in Kentucky
Hopkinsville, Kentucky